Dumisani Msibi (born 1 May 1995) is a South African footballer who plays as a goalkeeper for University of Pretoria and has represented South Africa.

Club career

SuperSport United
Msibi joined SuperSport United after trialling for the club in a tournament in which he was awarded the goalkeeper of the tournament accolade. In August 2015, Msibi extended his contract with SuperSport United for 4 years. However, 2 years later, after not playing for SuperSport United, the club allowed Msibi to leave to search for regular football, as Ronwen Williams, Reyaad Pieterse, and Boalefa Pule were picked ahead of him.

Loan to Cape Town All Stars
Msibi was loaned to Cape Town All Stars for the 2016–17 season. During the season he played 10 games, being the back-up keeper for Ludwe Mpakumpaku.

Witbank Spurs
After his release from SuperSport United, Msibi joined National First Division club Witbank Spurs.

Royal Eagles
In August 2018, Msibi joined Royal Eagles.

Real Kings
In January 2019, Msibi joined Real Kings, together with Zama Dlamini, to provide goalkeeping experience.

University of Pretoria
After a spell at Richards Bay, Msibi moved to University of Pretoria in January 2020.

International career
Msibi made his debut for the South African senior team on 30 November 2014 in a 2–0 victory over the Ivory Coast, when he was subbed on for the last 9 minutes and received a yellow card for time wasting.

He was selected in South Africa's preliminary squad for the 2016 CHAN qualifier against Angola on 17 October 2015.

Personal life
While playing football professionally, Msibi also studied sport management at Tshwane University of Technology.

References

External links

1995 births
Living people
People from Mkhondo Local Municipality
South African soccer players
Association football goalkeepers
SuperSport United F.C. players
Witbank Spurs F.C. players
Royal Eagles F.C. players
Real Kings F.C. players
Richards Bay F.C. players
University of Pretoria F.C. players
South African Premier Division players
National First Division players